The Khadaranya Range is a mountain range in the Verkhoyansk District, Sakha Republic (Yakutia), Far Eastern Federal District, Russia. The nearest airfield is Batagay Airport.

Geography
The Khadaranya Range rises in the northern sector of the Chersky Range, to the east of the lower course of the Yana River and to the west of the Moma-Selennyakh Depression where the Selennyakh river flows. 

The smaller Ymiysky Range (Ымыйский кряж) rises off the northwestern side, and the Tas-Khayakhtakh, one of the main subranges of the Chersky Mountains, rises off the southern end of the range.

See also
List of mountains and hills of Russia

References

External links

Landscapes as a reflection of the toponyms of Yakutia
Ranges of Russia

Mountain ranges of the Sakha Republic
Chersky Range
pl:Chadaranja
sah:Хадаранньа